Marguerita Anna Padula (December 20, 1890 – February 22, 1957) was an American actress and performer, active in film, vaudeville and radio. She was often typified as a character actress, with her film credits including Hit the Deck, The Cuckoos and Kid Dynamite.

Early life 

Padula was born in Worcester, Massachusetts, to an Italian father and Irish-American mother. Her early music experience as an organist for the choir at her local church. Padula studied at the New England Conservatory of Music and was acclaimed as one of the best young pianists in Worcester, often playing the accompanying music for amateur shows in the area. 

She married Francis Coffey in 1910.

Career 

By 1914, Padula entered the vaudeville circuit as one half of a comedic duo called “Hendricks & Padula”. During the 1920s she would play at various theaters around the country, receiving positive reviews for her piano playing, whistling and voice – said to have a range of four octaves. Her transition into the movie industry began with the role of Lavinia in the 1930 movie Hit the Deck. She was offered the role by an RKO executive after he heard her sing a rendition of the song ‘Hallelujah’ at a home gathering. For the next decade, Padula divided her time between film, radio and theater before taking a residency at a supper club run by Charley Foy in the San Fernando Valley.

Later years & death 

Towards the end of the 1940s, Padula’s health began to deteriorate to the point where she had to walk with the assistance of a cane. In September 1956, she was admitted to Mount Sinai Hospital (now Cedars-Sinai Medical Center) in Los Angeles suffering from pneumonia and ultimately had her leg amputated. She would later die at her home in West Hollywood on February 22, 1957, aged 66. She is buried at the Holy Cross Cemetery in Culver City.

Filmography

References

External links 

Margaret Padula at AFI Catalog

1890 births
1957 deaths
Actresses from Worcester, Massachusetts
Burials at Holy Cross Cemetery, Culver City
20th-century American actresses
American film actresses
American Roman Catholics
New England Conservatory alumni
American people of Irish descent
American people of Italian descent